César Espinoza del Canto (31 May 1908-31 October 1993) was a Chilean football goalkeeper.

References 

Born:	31.05.1908 Rinconada de los Andes, Aconcagua, Chile 
Death : 31.10.1993 San Bernardo, Metropolitana de Santiago, Chile

External links

Chilean footballers
Chile international footballers
Santiago Wanderers footballers
1930 FIFA World Cup players
1900 births
1956 deaths
Association football goalkeepers
Sportspeople from Viña del Mar